Azean Irdawaty binti Yusoef (27 February 1950 – 17 December 2013) was a Malaysian actress and singer, whose career spanned 40 years.

Personal life
Irdawaty began her singing career in 1970, and also had a film and television acting career.

Death
In 2008, she was diagnosed with cancer. On the night of 9 December 2013, she was admitted to the University Malaya Medical Centre (UMMC) after falling unconscious. Azean Irdawaty died from liver failure, caused by cancer, on 17 December, aged 63.  On 18 December 2013, she was buried at the Bukit Kiara Muslim Cemetery in Damansara, Kuala Lumpur.

Filmography

Film

Television series

Telemovie

References

External links
 

1950 births
2013 deaths
Malaysian television actresses
Malaysian film actresses
20th-century Malaysian women singers
Malaysian people of Malay descent
Malaysian Muslims
Deaths from liver failure
Deaths from cancer in Malaysia
Metrowealth Pictures contract players
Pesona Pictures contract players
Grand Brilliance contract players